This article documents the discography of country artist, Stella Parton.

Albums

Studio albums

Live albums

Remix albums

Compilation albums

Extended plays

Singles

Music videos

References 

Parton, Stella
Discographies of American artists